The Central District of Joghatai County is a district (bakhsh) in Joghatai County, Razavi Khorasan Province, Iran. At the 2006 census, its population was 21,874, in 5,631 families.  The District has one city: Joghatai. The District has two rural districts (dehestan): Dasturan Rural District and Joghatai Rural District.

References 

Districts of Razavi Khorasan Province
Joghatai County